Bai Xuesong is a Chinese ice sledge hockey player. He competed at the 2022 Winter Paralympics in Para ice hockey, winning a bronze medal.

He competed at the 2021 World Para Ice Hockey Championships.

References 

Year of birth missing (living people)
Living people
Chinese sledge hockey players
Paralympic sledge hockey players of China
Paralympic bronze medalists for China
Paralympic medalists in sledge hockey
Para ice hockey players at the 2022 Winter Paralympics
Medalists at the 2022 Winter Paralympics